The Treaty of Paris between Italy and the Allied Powers was signed on 10 February 1947, formally ending hostilities between both parties. It came into general effect on 15 September 1947.

Territorial changes

 Transfer of the Adriatic islands of Cres, Lošinj, Lastovo and Palagruža; of Istria south of the river Mirna; of the exclave territory of Zadar in Dalmatia; of the city of Rijeka and the region known as the Julian March to the Socialist Federal Republic of Yugoslavia;
 Transfer of the Italian Islands of the Aegean to the Kingdom of Greece;
 Transfer to France of Briga and Tenda, and minor revisions of the Franco-Italian border;
 Recognition of the independence of the People's Socialist Republic of Albania and transfer to Albania of the island of Sazan;
 Renunciation of claims to Ethiopia and restoration of the Ethiopian Empire;
 Renunciation of claims to colonies (including Libya, Eritrea and Somaliland) and dissolution of the Italian Empire;
 Cancellation of favourable commercial treaties with the Republic of China (including cessation of the Concession in Tianjin held by Italy since 7 September 1901)
 Trieste and the surrounding area were incorporated into a new independent state called the Free Territory of Trieste. In 1954, the administration of the Free Territory was handed over to the Italian Government, while the mandate of the Yugoslav Army was ceded to the Yugoslav Government with the Memorandum of Understanding of London regarding the Free Territory of Trieste.
 As provided by Annex XI of the Treaty, upon the recommendation of the United Nations General Assembly in Resolution 390 (V) of 2 December 1950, Eritrea was federated with Ethiopia on 11 September 1952. Eritrea gained its independence from Ethiopia de facto on 24 May 1991 and de jure on 24 May 1993.

Italian Somaliland was under British administration until 1949 when it became a United Nations Trust Territory under Italian administration. Italian Somaliland combined with British Somaliland on 1 July 1960 and together they became the Somali Republic.

Reparations
Italy was obliged to pay the following war reparations (article 74):
$125,000,000 US to Yugoslavia
$105,000,000 US to Greece
$100,000,000 US to the Soviet Union 
$25,000,000 US to Ethiopia
$5,000,000 US to Albania

The amounts were valued in the US dollar at its gold parity on 1 July 1946 ($35 for one ounce of gold). The reparations were to be paid in goods and services over a seven-year period.

Military clauses
Articles 47 and 48 called for the demolition of all permanent fortifications along the Franco-Italian and Yugoslav-Italian frontier. Italy was banned from possessing, building or experimenting with atomic weapons, guided missiles, guns with a range of over 30 km, non-contact naval mines and torpedoes as well as manned torpedoes (article 51).

The military of Italy was limited in size. Italy was allowed a maximum of 200 heavy and medium tanks (article 54). Former officers and non-commissioned officers of the Blackshirts and the National Republican Army were barred from becoming officers or non-commissioned officers in the Italian military (except those exonerated by the Italian courts, article 55).

The Italian navy was reduced. Some warships were awarded to the governments of the Soviet Union, the United States, the United Kingdom and France (articles 56 and 57). Italy was ordered to scuttle all its submarines (article 58) and was banned from acquiring new battleships, submarines and aircraft carriers (article 59). The navy was limited to a maximum force of 25,000 personnel (article 60). The Italian army was limited to a size of 185,000 personnel plus 65,000 Carabinieri for a maximum total of 250,000 personnel (article 61). The Italian air force was limited to 200 fighters and reconnaissance aircraft plus 150 transport, air-rescue, training and liaison aircraft and was banned from owning and operating bomber aircraft (article 64). The number of air force personnel was limited to 25,000 (article 65). Most of the military restrictions were lifted upon Italy becoming a founding member of NATO in 1949.

Political clauses
Article 17 of the treaty banned fascist organisations ("whether political, military, or semi-military") in Italy.

Annexes
A subsequent annex to the treaty provided for the cultural autonomy of the German minority in South Tyrol.

Greece–Turkey relations 
Article 14 of the treaty ceded the Italian islands in the Aegean to Greece and further stipulated that they "shall be and shall remain demilitarized". 

Turkey is the intended third party beneficiary of the demilitarization treaty by law (Vienna Convention of Treaties, art. 36(2)). Turkey did not want to sign any treaty ceding Rhodes to Greece but demanded demilitarization of Anatolian islands.

Despite not being party to the treaty, Turkey cites it in their ongoing tensions to accuse Greece of illegally militarizing the Aegean, going so far as to use it as a basis to call Greek sovereignty over the islands into question.

See also
 Paris Peace Treaties, 1947
 Armistice of Cassibile

References

External links
 Full text of the treaty (French, English and Russian texts are authentic) - archive link.

Aftermath of World War II
World War II treaties
Peace treaties of Italy
Treaties of Australia
Treaties of Belgium
Treaties of the Second Brazilian Republic
Treaties of Canada
Treaties of the Republic of China (1912–1949)
Treaties of Czechoslovakia
Peace treaties of the Soviet Union
Peace treaties of France
Peace treaties of India
Peace treaties of the Netherlands
Peace treaties of Poland
Peace treaties of South Africa
Peace treaties of the United States
Peace treaties of the United Kingdom
Treaties concluded in 1947
Treaties entered into force in 1947
Treaties of the French Fourth Republic
Treaties of the Polish People's Republic
Treaties of Italy
Treaties of the Netherlands
Treaties of Yugoslavia
Treaties of the Union of South Africa
Treaties of India
Treaties of the Kingdom of Greece
Italy–Yugoslavia relations
Italy–United States relations
Italy–United Kingdom relations
Italy–Soviet Union relations
France–Italy relations
Peace treaties of Greece